The Swedish-ESO Submillimetre Telescope (SEST) is a 15-metre diameter radio telescope. It was originally located at the La Silla Observatory in Chile, and will be moved to Africa and repurposed as the Africa Millimetre Telescope.

La Silla Observatory, Chile 
The telescope was built in 1987 as a combined project between ESO and Onsala Space Observatory, with contributions from Finland and Australia. It was then the only large telescope for submillimetre astronomy in the southern hemisphere. It was decommissioned in 2003.

The telescope was used for single-dish observations of a wide range of astronomical objects, especially the Galactic Center and the Magellanic Clouds and for interferometric observations at millimetre wavelengths.

In 1995 observations made with SEST showed that the Boomerang Nebula is the coldest known location in the universe, with a temperature lower than the background radiation.

Africa Millimetre Telescope 
In 2022 it was announced that the telescope will be relocated on or near to Table Mountain, within the Gamsberg Nature Reserve in Namibia, with the exact location to be decided. It will be the first millimetre radio telescope in mainland Africa. The relocation, refurbishment, and modifications, as well as operations and outreach activities, will cost $25 million. The project started in 2022, and will last for five years. The telescope will operate as part of the Event Horizon Telescope for 20% of its time. The project is a collaboration between the University of Namibia, Windhoek, and Radboud University Nijmegen, Netherlands, and also involves the European Southern Observatory and the Netherlands Research School for Astronomy (NOVA). It follows from a proposal to construct such a telescope in Africa in 2017.

Gallery

See also
 Atacama Pathfinder Experiment

References

European Southern Observatory
Radio telescopes
Submillimetre telescopes
1987 establishments in Chile
Buildings and structures in Namibia